CILB-FM is a Canadian radio station broadcasting a classic hits format at 103.5 FM in Lac La Biche, Alberta. The station is branded as Boom 103.5 and was owned by Newcap Broadcasting until they were bought out by Stingray Group.

Newcap received approval from the Canadian Radio-television and Telecommunications Commission (CRTC) on January 18, 2006 and CILB was officially launched on December 7, 2007 at 10:35 AM as Big Dog 103.5, airing an adult hits format.

On July 7, 2017, at Midnight, after playing "Who Let The Dogs Out" by Baha Men (which was also the first song played as "Big Dog"), CILB flipped to classic hits as Boom 103.5. The first song played on "Boom" was "I'd Do Anything for Love (But I Won't Do That)" by Meatloaf.

References

External links
Boom 103.5
 

ILB
ILB
ILB
Radio stations established in 2007
2007 establishments in Alberta